Simhavishnu (IAST: Siṃhaviṣṇu) also known as Avanisimha son of Simhavarman III and one of the Pallava kings of India, was responsible for the revival of the Pallavan dynasty. He was the first Pallava monarch whose domain extended beyond Kanchipuram (Kanchi) in the South. He was portrayed as a great conqueror in Mattavilasa Prahasana (drunken revelry), a drama written by his son Mahendravarman I.

Reign
Sailendra Nath Sen 575-600 AD.

T.V. Mahalingam 575–615 CE.

KAN Sastri 555–590 CE.

He ruled at least for 33 years based on the available Hero stones. However, there is no exact consensus as to Simhavishnu's period on the throne.

Expansion of kingdom
When Simhavishnu ascended the throne, the Pallava dynasty was beginning to reassert its supremacy.

The southern peninsula of India was then ruled by five dynasties. The Pallavas, the Cholas and the Pandyas shared the power in Tamil Nadu, Andhra Pradesh, parts of southern and eastern Karnataka border and Ceylon; the Cheras controlled Kerala and the Chalukyas controlled Karnataka. Simhavishnu, who was known for his gallant martial courage and judicial wisdom from a young age, overthrew the Kalabhras and conquered the region up to Kaveri, where he came into conflict with the Pandyas and Ceylon. He dispatched a naval expedition and occupied Malaya and Sri Lanka and established Kanchipuram as his capital. The presence of the Pallavas, much before further naval expeditions to Indo-China by their illustrious succeeding and contemporary empires such as the Pandiyans and the Cholas, is attested by the existence of specimen of art bearing striking resemblance in countries like Thailand, Laos, Cambodia, as well as scores of inscriptions in those lands in the Grantha script (a script in which both Tamil and Sanskrit can be written) in which the Pallavas were the first to specialize.

Simhavishnu led the revival of the Pallavas, and the period starting with him came to be known as the Greater Pallavas or Later Pallavas dynasty. The great struggle between the Pallavas and the Chalukyas, which would last for more than two centuries, began during the reign of Simhavishnu.

Contribution to literature
Simhavishnu is known to have been the patron of the Sanskrit poet Bharavi, who wrote of the duel between Siva and Arjuna known as Kirata Arjuneeya, after which Shiva blessed Arjuna with the divine Pashupatastra.  The structure of Bharavi's play suggests that it was written for koodiyattam plays for worship in temples during festivals. Kirata Arjuneeya is used as a subject for koodiyattam performances even today.

Religious affiliation
As with most Indian monarchs, Simhavishnu was also religious. Great endowments were given to temples across the Tamil region. His father Simhavarma also may have entered the Tamil pantheon of Saivite saints who had gained mukti at the feet of the lord.

Periyapuranam mentions a Pallava ruler, Aiyatikal Kaadavarkon, who at Chidambaram composed hymns in praise of the Lord in venpaa metre of Tamil and attained mukti. There is evidence that this could have been Simhavarman, as it is said that he had first gilded the temple with gold after bathing in the temple tank cured him of illness.

In the Udayendiram copper plates of Nandivarman II, Simhavishnu was a devotee of Vishnu. This is a noteworthy point as his son Mahendravarman I was a Jaina who opposed all the Shaivite practices before being converted to Shaivism. Simhavishnu's portrait can be seen in the stone engraving at the Adivaraha Mandapam, an elegant shrine at Mahabalipuram. The monuments and temples in Mahabalipuram are achievements of the Pallava dynasty, and they still exist in Tamil Nadu. Simhavishnu was succeeded by his son Mahendravarman I.

Notes

References
 
 Hirsh, Marilyn "Mahendravarman I Pallava: Artist and Patron of Mamallapuram", Artibus Asiae, Vol. 48, No. 1/2. (1987), pp. 113

External links
  Simhavishnu portrait

Pallava kings
6th-century Indian monarchs